Alsodryas is a genus of moths in the family Gelechiidae.

Species
 Alsodryas deltochlora Meyrick, 1922
 Alsodryas lactaria Meyrick, 1914
 Alsodryas prasinoptila Meyrick, 1922

References

Anacampsinae
Moth genera